Fernand Borrel (born 21 April 1939) is a French cross-country skier. He competed in the men's 50 kilometre event at the 1968 Winter Olympics.

References

1939 births
Living people
French male cross-country skiers
Olympic cross-country skiers of France
Cross-country skiers at the 1968 Winter Olympics
Place of birth missing (living people)